The 2002 Mecklenburg-Vorpommern state election was held on 22 September 2002 to elect the members of the 4th Landtag of Mecklenburg-Vorpommern. It was held on the same day as the 2002 federal election. The incumbent coalition government of the Social Democratic Party (SPD) and Party of Democratic Socialism (PDS) led by Minister-President Harald Ringstorff retained its majority and continued in office.

Campaign and issues
The election was the first time that a "red-red" SPD–PDS government faced an election. It was held at the same day as the 2002 federal election, and the campaigns of the state parties were highly influenced by the issues in the federal politics.

Parties
The table below lists parties represented in the 3rd Landtag of Mecklenburg-Vorpommern.

Opinion polling

Election result

|-
! colspan="2" | Party
! Votes
! %
! +/-
! Seats 
! +/-
! Seats %
|-
| bgcolor=| 
| align=left | Social Democratic Party (SPD)
| align=right| 394,118
| align=right| 40.6
| align=right| 6.3
| align=right| 33
| align=right| 6
| align=right| 46.5
|-
| bgcolor=| 
| align=left | Christian Democratic Union (CDU)
| align=right| 304,125
| align=right| 31.4
| align=right| 1.2
| align=right| 25
| align=right| 1
| align=right| 35.2
|-
| bgcolor=| 
| align=left | Party of Democratic Socialism (PDS)
| align=right| 159,065
| align=right| 16.4
| align=right| 8.0
| align=right| 13
| align=right| 7
| align=right| 18.3
|-
! colspan=8|
|-
| bgcolor=| 
| align=left | Free Democratic Party (FDP)
| align=right| 45,676
| align=right| 4.7
| align=right| 3.1
| align=right| 0
| align=right| ±0
| align=right| 0
|-
| bgcolor=| 
| align=left | Alliance 90/The Greens (Grüne)
| align=right| 25,402
| align=right| 2.6
| align=right| 0.1
| align=right| 0
| align=right| ±0
| align=right| 0
|-
| bgcolor=#63B8FF|
| align=left | Party for a Rule of Law Offensive (Schill party)
| align=right| 16,483
| align=right| 1.7
| align=right| New
| align=right| 0
| align=right| New
| align=right| 0
|-
| bgcolor=|
| align=left | Others
| align=right| 25,162
| align=right| 2.6
| align=right| 
| align=right| 0
| align=right| ±0
| align=right| 0
|-
! align=right colspan=2| Total
! align=right| 970,031
! align=right| 100.0
! align=right| 
! align=right| 71
! align=right| ±0
! align=right| 
|-
! align=right colspan=2| Voter turnout
! align=right| 
! align=right| 70.6
! align=right| 8.6
! align=right| 
! align=right| 
! align=right| 
|}

Sources
 The Federal Returning Officer

2002 elections in Germany
2002
2000s in Mecklenburg-Western Pomerania